Slate is an unincorporated community in Buchanan County, Virginia, in the United States.

History
A post office was established at Slate in 1938, and remained in operation until it was discontinued in 1965. The community took its name from Slate Creek.

References

Unincorporated communities in Buchanan County, Virginia
Unincorporated communities in Virginia